73P/Schwassmann–Wachmann, also known as Schwassmann–Wachmann 3, is a periodic comet that has a 5.4 year orbital period and that has been actively disintegrating since 1995. It last came to perihelion (closest approach to the Sun) in March 2017 when fragment 73P-BT was separating from the main fragment 73P-C. Fragments 73P-BU and 73P-BV were detected in July 2022. The main comet came to perihelion on 25 August 2022 The comet was 0.97 AU from the Sun and 1 AU from Earth. It will be less than 80 degrees from the Sun from 25 May 2022 until August 2023. 

Comet Schwassmann–Wachmann 3 was one of the comets discovered by astronomers Arnold Schwassmann and Arno Arthur Wachmann, working at the Hamburg Observatory in Bergedorf, Germany. It began disintegrating on its re-entry to the inner Solar System in 1995, in a reaction triggered by the Sun's heating of the comet as it emerged from the colder regions of the outer Solar System.

Comet 73P/Schwassmann–Wachmann is a parent body of meteor shower Tau Herculids and the 1995 break-up of the comet generated a modest meteor shower around 31 May 2022 4:00-5:00 UT that lasted a few hours.

The comet was discovered as astronomers were exposing photographic plates in search of minor planets for a minor planet survey, on May 2, 1930. The comet was lost after its 1930 apparition as the 1935 apparition had poor viewing geometry, but was recovered in 1979. During perihelion in 1985, the comet was unobserved as it was on the far side of the Sun 1.9 AU from Earth. In 1990 the comet reached apparent magnitude 9 and was the best appearance since 1930. On 12 May 2006 the comet passed  from Earth. During the 2011 perihelion passage the primary component 73P-C was recovered on 28 November 2010 near apparent magnitude 21.3; it came to perihelion on 16 October 2011.

At aphelion (farthest distance from the Sun) the comet often makes approaches to Jupiter as it did in 1965 and will in 2167. Schwassmann–Wachmann was originally estimated to have a pre-breakup nucleus diameter of approximately 2.2 km. In 2005 fragment C was estimated to be about 1 km in diameter.

Breakup 
In September 1995, 73P began to disintegrate. It was seen to break into four large pieces labeled 73P-A, B, C and D. As of March 2006, at least eight fragments were known: B, C, G, H, J, L, M and N. On April 18, 2006, the Hubble Space Telescope recorded dozens of pieces of fragments B and G. It appears that the comet may eventually disintegrate completely and cease to be observable (as did 3D/Biela in the 19th century), in which case its designation would change from 73P to 73D. In May 2006, it was known to have split into at least 66 separate objects. In April 2006, fragment C was the largest and the presumed principal remnant of the original nucleus.

In 1930 when the comet passed Earth that close, there was a meteor shower on June 9 with as many as 100 meteors per hour. Analysis by P. A. Wiegert et al. suggested that a recurrence of that spectacle was unlikely.

Over many decades the fragments of 73P from 1995 and 2006 will disperse over the orbital path of 73P as they are all moving at a slightly different speed. Known fragments of 73P have orbital periods of 4.7 years (73P-AJ) to 6.1 years (73P-Y).

The non-primary fragment 73P-BT which has an observation arc of 250 days from February 2017 to October 2017 and (if it had survived) was expected to come to perihelion on 26 August 2022. On 23 July 2022 fragments JD001 (73P-BU) and JD002 (73P-BV) were detected and came to perihelion on 24 August 2022. Three additional fragments "BW, BX, and BY" that were discovered in mid-August were announced on 2 September 2022. 73P-BX had a 9-day observation arc giving it the longest observation arc of the five fragments discovered in 2022.

The comet was to have been visited by the CONTOUR comet nucleus probe on June 18, 2006, but contact with the probe was lost on August 15, 2002 when it fired its Star 30BP solid rocket motor to inject itself into solar orbit.

Image gallery

References

External links 

 73P, bt fragment via Virtual Telescope Project
 Hubble provides spectacular detail of a comet's breakup
 73P at Kronk's Cometography
 Mini-comets approaching Earth (NASA)
 Sky and Telescope article
 73P/Schwassmann–Wachmann at ESA/Hubble
 73P/Schwassmann–Wachmann 3 (2022) aerith.net
 73P-c Lightcurve (Artyom Novichonok)

Periodic comets
073P
0073
Split comets

Articles containing video clips
Comets in 2011
Comets in 2017
Comets in 2022
19300502